Santa Sofia d'Epiro is an Arbëresh town and comune in the province of Cosenza in the Calabria region of southern Italy.

The town is bordered by Acri, Bisignano, San Demetrio Corone and Tarsia.

People
 Angelo Masci (1758–1821), writer

External links 

Shqiponjat (folk group)

Notes and references

Arbëresh settlements
Cities and towns in Calabria